Manivald is an animated short film, directed by Chintis Lundgren and released in 2017.

Plot

The film centres on Manivald (Trevor Boris), an underachieving fox in his early 30s who still lives with his mother (France Castel), but finds their relationship endangered when they simultaneously fall in love with Toomas (Drasko Ivezic), the handsome wolf repairman who arrives to fix their washing machine.

Production

The film, adapted from Lundgren's prior webcomic Manivald and the Absinthe Rabbits, was created as a pilot for an animated series, in which Manivald would move out of his mother's house and take up residence at The Hedgehog's Closet, a gay bar run by a cross-dressing hedgehog. The series was also planned to incorporate characters from Lundgren's prior animated short film Life with Herman H. Rott. As of 2019, however, no series pickup has been announced; however, Toomas' own family life was the subject of Lundgren's 2019 animated short film Toomas Beneath the Valley of the Wild Wolves. The film was also added to internet streaming platforms, including Facebook, YouTube, Vimeo and the National Film Board of Canada's website, in 2019.

Reception

The film was a Canadian Screen Award nominee for Best Animated Short Film at the 6th Canadian Screen Awards. The film is currently available to purchase on Amazon Prime Video.

References

External links
 
 

2017 films
2017 animated films
2017 short films
2010s animated short films
2017 LGBT-related films
Animated films about foxes
Films based on webcomics
National Film Board of Canada animated short films
Canadian LGBT-related short films
LGBT-related animated films
Estonian animated short films
Croatian animated short films
2010s English-language films
2010s Canadian films